The Roman Catholic Diocese of Divinópolis is a diocese located in the city of Divinópolis in the Ecclesiastical province of Belo Horizonte in Brazil.

History
 July 11, 1958: Established as Diocese of Divinópolis from the Diocese of Aterrado and Metropolitan Archdiocese of Belo Horizonte

Bishops
 Bishops of Divinópolis (Roman rite), listed in reverse chronological order)
 Bishop José Carlos de Souza Campos (2014.02.26 - Present)
 Bishop Tarcísio Nascentes dos Santos (2009.02.11 – 2012.08.01), appointed Bishop of Duque de Caxias, Rio de Janeiro
 Bishop José Belvino do Nascimento (1989.02.27 – 2009.02.11)
 Bishop José Costa Campos (1979.03.26 – 1989.02.27)
 Bishop Cristiano Portela de Araújo Pena (1959.02.19 – 1979.03.26)

Other priests of this diocese who became bishops
Gil Antônio Moreira, appointed Auxiliary Bishop of São Paulo in 1999
Moacir Silva Arantes, appointed Auxiliary Bishop of Goiânia, Goias in 2016
Francisco Cota de Oliveira, appointed Auxiliary Bishop of Curitiba, Parana in 2017

Sources
 GCatholic.org
 Catholic Hierarchy
 Diocese website 

Roman Catholic dioceses in Brazil
Christian organizations established in 1958
Divinopolis, Roman Catholic Diocese of
Roman Catholic dioceses and prelatures established in the 20th century
1958 establishments in Brazil